The Baum test (also known as the "Tree test" or, in other countries, the "Koch test") is a projective test that is used extensively by psychologists around the world. It is employed as a method of analyzing an individual's personality and underlying emotional history.

The Baum test was developed by Swiss vocational guidance counsellor Charles Koch in 1952. It was developed with the influence of a colleague who specialized in mythology.

Process 
There are two parts to the Baum test. First, the patients are asked to draw a broad-leaved tree on a standard 8.5″ × 11″ blank sheet of paper. There are cases where the patients are also asked to write a short essay about the drawn tree. A psychologist or a psychiatrist will then evaluate the different aspects of the tree drawing as well as the individual's behavior /comments while completing the test. The evaluation is based on standard criteria and scored from "very immature" to "very mature" while the essay is graded from advanced, normal, and backwards. 

A tree is selected as the object to be drawn because trees serve as an important element in mythologies all over the world. Additionally, trees are a nonthreatening element that allow for a wide range of adaptation. It is suggested by some psychologists (e.g. J.H. Plokker) that the type of tree an individual draws relates to the structure of the psyche or unconscious itself or that it symbolizes one's personality as it can project self-image.

Forms of analysis
Two forms of analysis are used to evaluate and interpret the Baum test. The global structure analysis views the tree as a whole, such the tree's overall size and location on the paper. The internal structure analysis focuses on the finer details of the tree. There are 59 detail oriented aspects of the tree drawing that are used to evaluate an individual's thoughts or feelings including roots, trunk, branches, crown, leaves, knots, shading, symmetry, archetypal features etc.

Advantages and limitations
Advantages of the Baum test are that it can be administered quickly (usually 5–10 minutes), to a wide range of individuals, and it offers the clinician an opportunity to observe the patients motor skills.

Limitations of the Baum test are that it cannot be scored objectively. “One problem concerning the validity of the drawing technique is that researchers choose procedures that will no doubt result in nonsignificant findings. For example, they isolate one or a few indices from a figure drawing rating scale, taken completely out of context, and then attempt to correlate these indices with measure they view as excellent criterion variables, such as self-report inventories.” Additionally, the test typically not used on patients with very low IQs because their drawings tend to be quite meager.

Indications
Large Baum: indicates self-confidence
Small Baum: indicates a lack of self-confidence
Big trunk: indicates straightforwardness and liveliness
Small trunk: indicates weariness
Deep Roots: indicates stability
No Roots/Shallow roots: indicates a feeling of exclusion
No Branches/Small Branches: indicates unsocial behavior
Big Branches: indicates arrogance
Large Leaves: indicates friendliness, social ability
Small Leaves: indicates shyness

References 

 Baum-Tests by Ursula Avé-Lallemant 2002 (in German)

External links 
 Article on Baum test (in German)
 Baum Forms and Their Meanings: A Case Study
 Agamic Psychology: The Baum Test and Hermeneutic Semiotics

Mental disorders screening and assessment tools